David Klöcker Ehrenstrahl (23 September 1628 – 23 October 1698) was a Swedish nobleman and portrait painter.

Biography
David Klöcker  was born in Hamburg.  He was the son of Johann Klöcker  and had eight siblings.
In 1648, Klöcker  traveled to Amsterdam where he learned  how to paint following the instructions from Juriaen Jacobsze (1624–1685).

In 1652, he left his art studies in the Netherlands and  moved to Skokloster Castle (Skoklosters slott)  on Lake Mälaren, Sweden  at the request of Swedish nobleman Carl Gustaf Wrangel (1613–1676). Between 1654 and 1661 he studied in Italy and visited the courts of both France and England. On his return he became entitled Court painter (hovkonterfejare) in 1661. He was raised to the nobility in 1674 at which time he took the surname  Ehrenstråhl. He became court intendant in 1690. He made portraits of, among others, King Charles XI of Sweden, Erik Dahlbergh, Georg Stiernhielm and Agneta Horn. 
Among his pupils can be found Mikael Dahl and David von Krafft as well as his daughter Anna Maria Ehrenstrahl  . 

Ehrenstrahl also painted several ceilings and large wall pieces with allegoric motifs. The great hall ceiling fresco, named The Great Deeds of The Swedish Kings, in the Swedish House of Knights (Riddarhuspalatset) made between 1670 and 1675, is considered to be his greatest work. A second version was made during 1695 on the ceiling of Ehrenstrahlsalongen (the Ehrenstrahl parlour) at Drottningholm Palace, the home of the Swedish Royal Family.
The center piece of the Drottningholm fresco also became the motive of the 1000th postage stamp  designed by Polish postage stamp and banknote engraver Czesław Słania (1921-2005). The stamp was issued by the PostNord Sverige in March 2000.

Ehrenstrahl is also known for his proposal, in 1694, that:- "Art presents riddles that could not be solved by everyone".

Personal life
Ehrenstrahl was married to Maria Momma in 1663. He was the father of artist Anna Maria Ehrenstrahl (1666–1729) and the  uncle of painter David von Krafft. He died during 1698 in Stockholm.

References

Other sources
familysearch.org Accessed August 6, 2008

1628 births
1698 deaths
Artists from Hamburg
German emigrants to Sweden
German Baroque painters
17th-century Swedish painters
Swedish portrait painters
Swedish male painters
Swedish nobility
Court painters